The 2018 Canberra Raiders Cup was the 21st season of the cup, the top division Rugby League club competition in Canberra. The 2018 Canberra Raiders Cup consisted of 18 regular season rounds that began on the 5th of April and ended on the 11th of August. There was 3 playoff rounds, beginning on the 18th of August with the major semi-final, and ending on the 2nd of September with the grand final.

Teams 
There was  9 teams playing in 2018. 5 teams from Canberra, 2 from Queanbeyan, 1 from Yass, and 1 from Goulburn.

All 9 clubs fielded a team in the reserve grade competition. And 6 clubs will field a team in the under 18's competition.

Ladder 

 Teams highlighted in green have qualified for the finals
 The team highlighted in blue have clinched the minor premiership
 The team highlighted in red have clinched the wooden spoon

Ladder progression 

 Numbers highlighted in green indicate that the team finished the round inside the top 4.
 Numbers highlighted in blue indicates the team finished first on the ladder in that round.
 Numbers highlighted in red indicates the team finished last place on the ladder in that round.
 Underlined numbers indicate that the team had a bye during that round.

Canberra Raiders Cup Results (First Grade)

Round 1

Round 2

Round 3

Round 4

Round 5

Round 6

Round 7

Round 8

Round 9

Round 10

Round 11

Round 12

Round 13

Round 14

Round 15

Round 16

Round 17

Round 18

Canberra Raiders Cup Finals series

George Tooke Shield Results (Second Division)

Teams 
There were 9 teams playing in 2018. 3 teams from Canberra. 6 teams from New South Wales towns surrounding Canberra.

5 clubs fielded a side in the second division under 18's competition.

Ladder 

 Teams highlighted in green have qualified for the finals
 The team highlighted in blue have clinched the minor premiership
 The team highlighted in red have clinched the wooden spoon

Ladder progression 

 Numbers highlighted in green indicate that the team finished the round inside the top 5.
 Numbers highlighted in blue indicates the team finished first on the ladder in that round.
 Numbers highlighted in red indicates the team finished last place on the ladder in that round.
 Underlined numbers indicate that the team had a bye during that round.

Results

Round 1

Round 2

Round 3

Round 4

Round 5

Round 6

Round 7

Round 8

Round 9

Round 10

Round 11

Round 12

Round 13

Round 14

Round 15

Round 16

Round 17

Round 18

George Tooke Shield Finals series

Notes 

* - Won by forfeit

Reserve Grade Finals series

Canberra Raiders Cup Reserve Grade

Finals series

Under 18's Finals series'

Canberra Raiders Cup Under 18's

Finals series

George Tooke Shield Youth League

Finals series

Ladies League Tag Finals series'

Canberra Raiders Cup Ladies League Tag

Finals series

George Tooke Shield Ladies League Tag

Finals series

Open Women's Tackle Finals series

Katrina Fanning Shield

Finals series

See also 

 Canberra Rugby League

Canberra Raiders
2018 in Australian rugby league